The Sistan and Baluchestan insurgency, part of the Balochistan conflict, began approximately in 2004 and is an ongoing low-intensity asymmetric conflict in Sistan and Baluchestan Province between Iran and several Baloch Sunni militant organizations which are designated as terrorist organizations by Iran.

Background

Motivations of the insurgent groups
Analysts believe that aim of insurgents may differ from separatism to religious motivations, but they are not entirely clear. The leaders of the groups have maintained different positions: from Baloch nationalism to Salafi jihadism.

Belligerents

Iran
 Islamic Republic of Iran Army and Islamic Revolutionary Guard Corps, responsible for both military and security actions
 Ministry of Intelligence, doing intelligence operations
 Border Guard Command, engaging border conflicts with insurgent groups

Baloch rebels
 Jundallah: founded in 2002, was active since 2005, carrying out armed assaults against Iranian armed forces as well as civilians. Since arrest and execution of its leader Abdolmalek Rigi in 2010, they were responsible for a few bombings in 2011 under command of Muhammad Dhahir Baluch.
 Harakat Ansar Iran: founded in 2012, they rose up against the Iranian government and claimed responsibility for attacks on the IRGC Personnel and civilians. The group was disbanded in December 2013 due to a merger.
 Jaish ul-Adl: founded in 2012 by former Jundallah members, there is very little known about the group. They are led by Salahuddin Farooqui who has opposed Iranian support for Syria in the Syrian Civil War. They have claimed responsibility for dozens of operations since 2013.
 Ansar Al-Furqan: founded by December 2013 merger of Harakat Ansar and Pashton group Hizb Al-Furqan. They are linked to Al-Nusra Front and are led by Sheikh Abu-Hafs al-Baloochi.

Timeline

2005

December- A bomb exploded near a car carrying then president Mahmoud Ahmadinejad during an ambush in the province, resulting in the death of one of his bodyguards and another individual.

2007

14 February - A car bomb detonated in front of a bus transporting members of Iran's revolutionary guard corps in Zehedan reportedly resulting in the death of 11 and injury of 34 others.

2019

29 January - A double-bombing lightly wounded three police officers in Zahedan, the capital of Sistan and Balochistan province. Jaysh al-Adl claimed responsibility.
2 February - An IRGC soldier was killed and five others wounded in an insurgent attack on a Basij base in Nik Shahr city. Jaysh al-Adl claimed responsibility for the attack. According to Arab news, the attack was carried out by two people who climbed the walls of the Basij paramilitary base and started shooting.
13 February - A suicide car bomb attack targeting a bus carrying IRGC personnel on the Khash-Zahedan road killed at least 27 soldiers and wounded 13 more. Jaysh al-Adl claimed responsibility for the attack. According to Haaretz, the head of IRGC Maj. Mohammad Ali Jafari stated, without providing proof, that Israel gave the Emirates and Saudi Arabia the go ahead to conduct the attack.
21 March - Pakistan announced that it had rescued four Iranian soldiers kidnapped by the Jaysh al-Adl group last year. It did not announce any other details. Jaysh al-Adl had kidnapped 12 Iranian soldiers in October and later released five. Following the announcement, there were still three Iranian soldiers held by the group.
20 July - Two members of the IRGC were killed and another two wounded late at night during a confrontation with gunmen near the border with Pakistan. The confrontation occurred in Keshtegan area of Saravan County, province of Sistan and Baluchestan.

2020

30 June - Jaysh al-Adl claimed responsibility for a roadside IED blast that injured an IRGC commander on a road in Sistan and Balochistan Province.
5 August - Four police officers were injured when a sound bomb exploded next to their vehicle in Zahedan, capital of Sistan and Balochistan Province, Iran.
29 September - Three Basij members were killed and another was wounded in a drive-by shooting in Nik Shahr county, Sistan-Baluchistan Province.

2022

 1 January - The IRGC said in a statement that during clashes with a group of “armed terrorists” in the Kurin region of Sistan and Baluchestan province, three Basij members were killed in addition to six "terrorists".
 23 April - The IRGC's Qods sector headquarters announced the killing of a bodyguard of the commander of the 110th Salman Farsi Special Operations Brigade following an ambush at a military checkpoint near Zahedan.

Foreign involvement

Role of Pakistan
Pakistan is Iran's neighbour, sharing borders of its Balochistan with Sistan and Baluchestan. Pakistan's Balochistan province is also suffering from low-level insurgency waged by terrorist and separatist militants against the government of Pakistan. These Pakistani Baloch terrorist and separatist militants groups are allied with Iranian Baloch groups. Iran and Pakistan historically have a strategic alliance fighting these groups. In February 2014 the two states signed a pact sharing responsibility for combating militants operating across the border. According to a former U.S. intelligence officer, Jundallah leader Abdolmalek Rigi was captured by Pakistani officials and delivered to Iran with U.S. support: "It doesn't matter what they say. They know the truth."

Allegations of foreign involvement

Iran has long accused foreign states supporting insurgency in Sistan and Baluchestan. Several sources such as the ABC News, The New York Times, Daily Telegraph and Seymour Hersh have reported that Jundallah has received support from the United States. Israel, Saudi Arabia, United Kingdom and Sweden are other states allegedly sponsoring the group.

Claims of Central Intelligence Agency (CIA) support were debunked by a subsequent investigation showing that the CIA "had barred even the most incidental contact with Jundallah." The rumors originated in an Israeli Mossad "false flag" operation; Mossad agents posing as CIA officers met with and recruited members of Jundullah in cities such as London to carry out attacks against Iran. President George W. Bush "went absolutely ballistic" when he learned of Israel's actions, but the situation was not resolved until President Barack Obama's administration "drastically scaled back joint U.S.-Israel intelligence programs targeting Iran" and ultimately designated Jundallah a terrorist organization in November 2010. Although the CIA cut all ties with Jundallah after the 2007 Zahedan bombings, the Federal Bureau of Investigation (FBI) and United States Department of Defense continued to gather intelligence on Jundallah through assets cultivated by "FBI counterterrorism task force officer" Thomas McHale; the CIA co-authorized a 2008 trip McHale made to meet his informants in Afghanistan. According to The New York Times: "Current and former officials say the American government never directed or approved any Jundallah operations. And they say there was never a case when the United States was told the timing and target of a terrorist attack yet took no action to prevent it." Mashregh News, which has close ties to the IRGC, has accused Qatar for supporting both Jaish ul-Adl and Harakat Ansar Iran, alongside Saudi Arabia. Harakat Ansar Iran has made an appeal on Saudi Arabian websites for funding.

References

Conflicts in 2004
History of Sistan and Baluchestan Province
Insurgencies in Asia

2000s conflicts
2020s conflicts
2010s conflicts
2000s in Iran
2004 in Iran
2010s in Iran
2020s in Iran